SRN Fast Seacrafts, Inc. which operates the Weesam Express ferry line, is a company based and founded in Zamboanga City, Philippines. The company was founded and headed by Hadji Ahmad W. Sakaluran as President and Hadji Wahab A. Amil his nephew in Zamboanga City. Established on April 17, 1997, it started with a vessel plying from Zamboanga City to Sandakan, Malaysia, and made them as one of the initial shipping companies plying the BIMP-EAGA route directly from Zamboanga City to Sandakan, Sabah, Malaysia and vice versa route. Weesam Express is now expanding their reach to Leyte, Bohol and Bacolod.

History 
It was during the inaugural or maiden voyage of MS Express (a passenger ferry boat of A. Sakaluran Shipping Corporation) headed by Hadji Ahmad W. Sakaluran as their President, last February 19, 1997 and Hadji Wahab A. Amil, a nephew of Hadji Ahmad W. Sakaluran was a guest, that when they were able to conferred later, Hadji Ahmad W. Sakaluran suggested to Hadji Wahab A. Amil that he can also partake in this type of business as the sea is a big area for all of them. It was during this talk that my name was suggested by Hadji Ahmad W. Sakaluran to prepare all the documents necessary for an entity to operate a passenger ferry boat within Zamboanga City.

The Weesam Express was started last April 17, 1997, when the main proponent, Hadji Wahab A. Amil contacted the undersigned to create a company to operate a passenger ferry boat in southern Philippines. It took a month later on May 13, 1997 when the SRN Fast Seacrafts, Inc. was formally organized, amended and registered with the Securities and Exchange Commission. SRN Fast Seacrafts was then working with the MV Lady Mary Joy 1 of Aleson Shipping Lines as its "Hepe De Viaje" (Chief of the cruise). It was the only ship then plying the BIMP-EAGA route directly from Zamboanga City to Sandakan, Sabah, Malaysia and vice versa route. A few days later, the undersigned arrived from Sandakan which prompted the beginning of organizing a company to manage a passenger ferry boat.

As for the passenger ferry boat acquisition, contact were made with Yong Choo Kui, owner of the Yong Choo Kui Shipyard. at Sibu, Sarawak, Malaysia. The first passenger steel hull boat was acquired from the operator of the Bullet Express, Upon acquisition, it was renamed as MV Weesam Express, named after the youngest son of Hadji Wahab A. Amil, Weesam. The inaugural voyage of the seacraft was on September 21, 1997, from Zamboanga City to Jolo, Sulu.

They soon expanded to Visayan waters with the acquisition of their succeeding Weesam ships. New routes included Cebu City to Ormoc and Cebu City to Dumaguete to Dapitan. However, their Zamboanga City - Sandakan, Malaysia route was later abandoned due to Aleson Shipping Lines cheaper rates. Later on, they introduced new routes for Basilan through Zamboanga City - Isabela City route.

Today, they are now in concentration of developing their existing routes, including their launch to their online booking through Facebook and developing their terminals on the ports where they're serving at.

Ports of call 
All of Weesam Express's are registered for the Port of Zamboanga. But their ships are actively in service to ports of Bacolod City, Cebu City, Iloilo City, Bacolod, Ormoc City, Tagbilaran City, Isabela City, and Jolo, Sulu.

Routes

Current 
These are their routes as of December 2017:
 Cebu City - Maasin
 Cebu City - Ormoc
 Cebu City - Tubigon
 Iloilo City - Bacolod
 Zamboanga City - Jolo, Sulu
 Zamboanga City - Isabela, Basilan

Former 
 Cebu City - Tagbilaran
 Zamboanga City - Sandakan, Sabah, Malaysia
 Zamboanga City - Bongao, Tawi-Tawi
 Dapitan - Dumaguete
 San Carlos City, Negros Occidental - Toledo City, Cebu

Fleet 

The shipping line has seven passenger vessels:
 Weesam Express 1
 Weesam Express 2
 Weesam Express 3
 Weesam Express 5
 Weesam Express 6
 Weesam Express 7
 Weesam Express 8

Subsidiary 
 A. Sakaluran Shipping Corporation (defunct)
 Amil's Tower Hotel and Restaurant

Notable incidents 
 On July 23, 2013, Weesam Express 7 was tossed by the waves and strong winds at around 8:00 in the morning while it was about to leave from Ormoc to Cebu. The fast craft reportedly failed to start and it floated away, hapless to the merciless elements. It ran aground at Bagsakan in Brgy. Alegria, around 10 meters from shore and 100 meters away from the port. Some of the passengers, including a 63-year old foreign national had to be brought to the hospital for hypertension due to the incident.
 On January 23, 2014, Weesam Express 7 with at least 160 passengers aboard yet again ran aground off Talisay in Cebu province. All passengers had been rescued. A week later, the vessel was temporarily suspended by the Maritime Industry Authority (Marina) over seaworthiness issues.

See also 
 List of shipping companies in the Philippines
 Aleson Shipping Lines
 2GO Travel
 Montenegro Lines
 Ever Shipping Lines Inc.
 Trans-Asia Shipping Lines

References

Notes 
 Everything Cebu - Weesam Express
 Transit: Going to Tawi-tawi

External links 
 

Ferry companies of the Philippines
Shipping companies of the Philippines
Transportation in Mindanao
Companies based in Zamboanga City